The Hudson Bay wolf (Canis lupus hudsonicus) is a subspecies of gray wolf native to northern Keewatin, including the northwestern coast of Hudson Bay in Canada. It was first classed as a distinct subspecies in 1941 by Edward Goldman, who described it as being a white colored, medium-sized subspecies similar to C. l. arctos, but with a flatter skull. This wolf is recognized as a subspecies of Canis lupus in the taxonomic authority Mammal Species of the World (2005).

References

External links

Mammals of Canada
Subspecies of Canis lupus
Mammals described in 1941
Taxa named by Edward Alphonso Goldman

fr:Canis lupus hudsonicus